Steve Ambri (born 12 August 1997) is a professional footballer who plays as a forward for  club Nîmes. Born in France, he plays for the Guinea-Bissau national team.

Club career
Ambri made his professional debut for Valenciennes FC in a Ligue 2 1–1 tie with AJ Auxerre on 16 December 2016.

On 12 July 2022, Ambri signed a two-year contract with Sheriff Tiraspol in Moldova.

On 30 January 2023, Ambri joined Nîmes in Ligue 2 until the end of the 2022–23 season.

International career
Ambri was born in France and is of Senegalese, Bissau-Guinean and Algerian descent. Ambri received a call-up to represent the France national under-20 football team for the 2018 Toulon Tournament on 17 May 2018. He scored on his debut against the South Korea U20s on 28 May 2018. He debuted with the Guinea-Bissau national team in a 0–0 2022 FIFA World Cup qualification tie with Guinea on 12 November 2021.

References

External links

Valenciennes Profile
FFF Profile

1997 births
People from Mont-Saint-Aignan
Sportspeople from Seine-Maritime
Citizens of Guinea-Bissau through descent
Bissau-Guinean people of Algerian descent
Bissau-Guinean people of Senegalese descent
French people of Bissau-Guinean descent
French sportspeople of Algerian descent
French sportspeople of Senegalese descent
Living people
French footballers
France youth international footballers
Bissau-Guinean footballers
Guinea-Bissau international footballers
Footballers from Normandy
Association football forwards
ESM Gonfreville players
Valenciennes FC players
FC Sochaux-Montbéliard players
FC Sheriff Tiraspol players
Nîmes Olympique players
Ligue 2 players
Moldovan Super Liga players
2021 Africa Cup of Nations players
Bissau-Guinean expatriate footballers
Expatriate footballers in Moldova
Bissau-Guinean expatriate sportspeople in Moldova